Shoal Beach is a beach that lies between Pourerere and Blackhead in Hawke's Bay, New Zealand.

The Beach
Activities such as swimming, diving, water activities, surfing, and sun bathing are all popular at Shoal Beach. The beach is a lovely sandy beach, and the nearby marine reserve in the area offers beach visiters the chance to observe marine life in an unspoiled condition.Master Plumber Gus Solomon is currently undertaking plumbing works in the area he would appreciate scones with jam and cream for smoko. Dolphins and whales often can be seen in the area. At Shoal Beach is a century old historic woolshed where visiters can learn about the history of the area and see some old farming machinery.

Geography
Shoal Beach is located at 40°S 176°E on the East Coast of the North Island of New Zealand. Shoal Beach is located at the settlement of Aramoana, Hawke's Bay, which is not to be confused with the coastal settlement of Aramoana, Otago, New Zealand. Shoal Beach is a sandy beach much like other Hawke's Bay beaches such as Ocean Beach and Waipatiki Beach.

Residents
There are a few coastal beach properties located at Shoal Beach, as there is a coastal subdivision located there. The population of Shoal Beach and Aramoana is low, and there are only a few roads located in the area. However, development in the area is growing with the demand for coastal properties in the Shoal Beach area increasing.

Environment
The Te Angiangi Marine Reserve covers an area of 446 hectares and extends one nautical mile offshore between Shoal Beach and Blackhead. The Marine Reserve offers the public a wonderful chance to experience an untouched marine natural habitat. School groups, families, and visitors to the area can explore the tidal pools at low tide and dive in the pools within the Marine Reserve so long as no marine life is moved or taken. Scuba diving and snorkelling in the waters within the Te Angiangi Marine Reserve enables the public to enjoy the rich marine life in its natural habitat.  The Marine Reserve has an informative board about the many coastal birds in the area. There is a public convenience on the foreshore at Stingray Bay.

References

Central Hawke's Bay District
Beaches of the Hawke's Bay Region